Gokwe North District is the northern of two administrative districts in the Gokwe region of the Midlands province of Zimbabwe. Its administrative seat is Nembudziya.

There are 36 wards under Gokwe North Rural District Council (GNRDC) evenly distributed in 4 constituencies. Nembudziya was a small growth point established due to the cotton farming activities as the majority of people in the area earn their living through agricultural activities.

Chief Jahane,  is one of the key notable traditional individual within the region.
Copper Queen (Sanyati) mine is located in ward 22. Zenda mine is also found in ward 22. Matize school is located 11 km north east of Copper Queen mine.Matize is one of the most beautiful villages of ward 22.People started settling in the area soon after independence. The local VaShangwe came from within the district from places such as Chinyenyetu, Kuwirirana, Nyamazengwe and Mudzongwe. People of the Karanga dialect came mainly from Shurugwi, Chivi, Gutu, Chirimuhanzu,Mberengwa and Zvishavane. Matize village thrives on cattle products, cotton and maize farming. Recently gold mine claims have been pegged with artisanal miners (makorokoza/maShurugwi) cashing in on the precious metal. Matize village does not have a secondary school. The nearest secondary school is Kamhonde across Sanyati river in Makonde, Mashonaland West, this also applies to the nearest health center (Kamhonde clinic).
Matize village falls under the jurisdiction of Headman Makore of the Shava totem. The paramount chief is Chireya also of the Shava totem.
Geography of Matize village. The village is located in the Sanyati Valley. The latitude being 900m above sea level. The vegetation is dominated by Mopane, Mupfuti baobab,muvanga and mutondo trees. Matize is blessed with many streams which are tributaries of the Sanyati River. These includes Matize, Mapfuti,Bowapuwa and Nyahondo. 
Neighboring villages includes Mutukanyi, Mutivura, Ronga, Nyaurungwe and across Sanyati river Chirariro and Kamhonde in Mashonaland West.

See also
 Gokwe South District
 Gokwe centre
Gokwe North District is found in ecological region 4, with arid and semi-arid conditions caused by the low average rainfall amounts of between 250 mm per year -800 mm per year. The temperatures range from 22-34 degrees Celsius(chiguye 2016). According to Brazer (2022), Gokwe district has many children out of school due to early marriage and pregnancy.Clean water shortages are very high with women and girls travelling long distances to fetch water from open sources, or queuing for more than an hour at boreholes.It is very difficult to achieve SDG 4 in Gokwe district considering the long distances between primary, secondary and high schools in the district.

References
 Nyambara, Pius Shungudzapera (2001) "The Politics of Land Acquisition and Struggles over Land in the 'Communal' Areas of Zimbabwe: The Gokwe Region in the 1980s and 1990s" Africa: Journal of the International African Institute 71(2): pp. 253–285

 
Districts of Midlands Province